Jianghan Road station may refer to:
Jianghan Road station (Wuhan Metro)
Jianghan Road station (Hangzhou Metro)